Stephanie Chiocci (born 6 December 1988) is an Australian rules footballer with the St Kilda Football Club in the AFL Women's (AFLW). She previously played for the Collingwood Football Club from 2017 to season seven. Chiocci served as Collingwood captain for the duration of her Collingwood career, including as co-captain alongside Brianna Davey from 2021 to season seven.

Early life
Chiocci grew up in Eltham, a suburb in Melbourne's north-east, and is of Italian descent. She attended high school at Catholic Ladies' College in Eltham.

Early football career

State league career
Chiocci played state league football for Diamond Creek in the Victorian Women's Football League (VWFL) and VFL Women's (VFLW) from 2006 to 2017. She was a member of the Creekers North East division premiership team in 2006 and won the club's best and fairest award that same season. That season, she also received the leagues' best first year player award. She repeated the result in 2012, with a second premiership and second club best and fairest. She kicked three goals in the winning grand final. Chiocci placed second in the league's best and fairest award at the conclusion of the 2009 season.
She captained the club from 2014 to 2017.

Representative football
Chiocci is a three-time senior All-Australian, winning the honours in consecutive AFL Women's National Championships in 2009, 2011 and 2013. In 2010, Chiocci was one of forty players to participate in the women's AFL high-performance camp.

She later played in the first women's exhibition match in June 2013. She was retained by the club and played in exhibition matches in each year through to the end of 2016. She captained the side in 2015 and 2016 including in the women's all-star match in September 2016.

Chiocci participated in AFL Victoria's female academy in 2015 and 2016, a program intending to lift the performances of some of the state's best female footballers.

AFL Women's career

She was named the club's inaugural AFL Women's captain in January 2017. Chiocci played in all seven games of the 2017 season. 

In May 2017, Collingwood signed her for the 2018 season. She played in the first five matches of the season, before she was suspended for making forceful head-high contact with  defender Libby Birch in round 5. She was suspended for two matches, ending her season after playing five matches. In May 2018, Chiocci was re-signed by Collingwood for the 2019 season.

Collingwood signed Chiocci for the 2020 season during the trade and sign period in April 2019.

In December 2020, it was announced that Chiocci would captain Collingwood for a fifth consecutive season in 2021, and that vice-captain and former  captain Brianna Davey would join her as co-captain.

She was left out again in round 6 to manage the same injury, before returning in round 8 against the Western Bulldogs.

Statistics
Updated to the end of S7 (2022).

|-
| 2017 ||  || 17
| 7 || 1 || 2 || 50 || 18 || 68 || 9 || 21 || 0.1 || 0.3 || 7.1 || 2.6 || 9.7 || 1.3 || 3.0 || 5
|-
| 2018 ||  || 17
| 5 || 2 || 1 || 42 || 28 || 70 || 7 || 21 || 0.4 || 0.2 || 8.4 || 5.6 || 14.0 || 1.4 || 4.2 || 3
|-
| 2019 ||  || 17
| 7 || 1 || 3 || 51 || 22 || 73 || 20 || 21 || 0.1 || 0.4 || 7.3 || 3.1 || 10.4 || 2.9 || 3.0 || 3
|-
| 2020 ||  || 17
| 7 || 1 || 0 || 59 || 50 || 109 || 25 || 22 || 0.1 || 0.0 || 8.4 || 7.1 || 15.6 || 3.6 || 3.1 || 3
|-
| 2021 ||  || 17
| 11 || 0 || 3 || 79 || 67 || 146 || 32 || 36 || 0.0 || 0.3 || 7.2 || 6.1 || 13.3 || 2.9 || 3.3 || 0
|-
| 2022 ||  || 17
| 7 || 1 || 2 || 46 || 45 || 91 || 18 || 19 || 0.1 || 0.3 || 6.6 || 6.4 || 13.0 || 2.6 || 2.7 || 0
|-
| S7 (2022) ||  || 17
| 11 || 2 || 3 || 76 || 41 || 117 || 25 || 29 || 0.2 || 0.3 || 6.9 || 3.7 || 10.6 || 2.3 || 2.6 || 1
|- class=sortbottom
! colspan=3 | Career
! 55 !! 8 !! 14 !! 403 !! 271 !! 674 !! 136 !! 169 !! 0.1 !! 0.3 !! 7.3 !! 4.9 !! 12.3 !! 2.5 !! 3.1 !! 15
|}

Personal life
Off-field, Chiocci works as a teacher at Parkdale Secondary College in Melbourne's south-east.

Honours and achievements
 Collingwood captain: 2017–S7 (2022) (co-captain 2021–S7 (2022))
 Victoria representative honours in AFL Women's State of Origin: 2017

References

External links

 
 

Living people
1988 births
Collingwood Football Club (AFLW) players
Australian rules footballers from Melbourne
Sportswomen from Victoria (Australia)
Australian schoolteachers
Victorian Women's Football League players
People from Eltham, Victoria
Australian people of Italian descent
People from Carlton, Victoria